Francis Quinn "Mike" Cassidy (April 21, 1926 – March 30, 2011) was an American and Canadian football player who played for the Saskatchewan Roughriders. A native of Bellaire, Ohio, Cassidy played college football at the University of Alabama. In 1994, he was included on the Roughriders' Plaza of Honour. He lived in Neffs, Ohio.

References

1926 births
Saskatchewan Roughriders players
2011 deaths